Hellinsia elhacha is a moth of the family Pterophoridae. It is found in Costa Rica.

Adults are on wing in February and June.

References

Moths described in 1999
elhacha
Moths of the Caribbean